Beau Monga (born 14 April 1994) is a New Zealand singer/beatboxer from Manurewa, who won the second season of the New Zealand version of The X Factor.

Early life
Monga was born in South Auckland in 1994. He is the son of Betty-Anne and Ryan Monga of the group Ardijah.

Musical influence
Monga cites his parents, James Brown and Michael Jackson as his main musical influences.

The X Factor

At his audition, Monga performed a version of "Hit the Road Jack" using a loop pedal. He received a standing ovation from all four judges and positive comments. As of 2022, his audition has received over 85 million combined views on Facebook and YouTube after going viral online. After the elimination of Nofo Lameko on week 2 and Stevie Tonks in week 9, Beau was the final act on the boys category who progressed through to the grand final. Going into the grand final, Beau was also the only act in series 2 who never landed in the bottom two. He eventually won the series after beating Nyssa Collins and Brendon Thomas and The Vibes in the grand final. He was initially mentored by Natalia Kills, but he was replaced by former Australian judge Natalie Bassingthwaighte after Kills was removed from the show due to a bullying controversy in the first live show. He is the first (and, to date, only) male winner of The X Factor NZ.

Discography

Digital releases from The X Factor

Singles

Albums

References

The X Factor (New Zealand TV series) contestants
1994 births
Living people
21st-century New Zealand male singers
The X Factor winners